is a fabric of Echigo, Japan on national Important Cultural Properties listing in 1955, and UNESCO's Intangible Cultural Heritage of Humanity list since 2009. It is made from fine bast fiber from the ramie plant (Boehmeria nivea), also called hemp, although not directly related to cannabis hemp. After it is woven on a jibata backstrap loom, the fabric is spread on snowfields (yuki-zarashi) where ultraviolet light from the sun creates ozone and bleaches it white. The fabric is used to make summer kimono and other traditional garments, cushions and bed linens.

Notes

References

Further reading
  UW Press page

External links

Fibers
Important Cultural Properties of Japan